The Buffalo Bisons (also known as the Germans) were an American basketball team based in Buffalo, New York that was a member of the American Basketball League.

Year-by-year

Sports in Buffalo, New York
Basketball teams in New York (state)
Defunct basketball teams in the United States